The Riddlers is a British children's programme produced by Yorkshire Television for ITV between 2 November 1989 and 27 August 1998.

Synopsis
The series centred on Marjorie Dawe and the two Riddlers (small humanoid creatures, portrayed by puppets, whose main aim in life was to "riddle things out") named Mossop (voiced by Richard Robinson) and Tiddler (female, but voiced by Mike Gallant), who inhabited her garden at Riddleton End. It would later be revealed that Tiddler was an orphan and had no other next of kin, so Mossop adopted Tiddler as an infant. Tiddler was not the latter's real name, but a title given to young apprentice Riddlers: once they achieved full Riddler status there would be a special (graduation type) ceremony, at which they would be given their 'real' name. Tiddler's training included being told twelve stories by a Riddlestone, usually one of 'Eesup's Foibles' (Yorkshire dialect for Aesop's Fables) – she would then have to 'riddle out' the moral of the story.

When Tiddler had achieved full Riddler status (by getting the morals of twelve stories correctly) she chose to be called Tiddlup at the ceremony.  Marjorie wanted to go to the ceremony but was told by Mossop that only Riddlers and Tiddlers could go as it was a Riddler law.  In order to go, she became a Riddler and started to study as a Riddler.

Other characters featured in the show included Marjorie's neighbour, Mr. Montgomery Grimley (a gardener and odd-job man), and several other Riddler characters – including another Tiddler known as Middler, Mossop's brother Glossop, and Eesup, a story-teller. Marjorie's sister Monica was also featured as a recurring character. Many of the plots featured in the series revolved around the male characters making mistakes which would then be solved by the female ones.

Series cast
Marjorie Dawe: Victoria Williams
Mr. Montgomery Grimley: Peter Llewellyn Jones
Monica: Sally Sheridan
Mossop/Middler: Richard Robinson
Tiddlup/Glossop/Eesup/McEyup: Mike Gallant

Production
Total of episodes were produced and broadcast during the series' nine-year run. For much of its run, The Riddlers was produced by Ian Fell and directed by Chris Ryder (later a series producer). Later series were directed by Ann Ayoub. The executive producer was Chris Jelley.

All episodes were written by Rick Vanes (whose previous work for YTV included Puddle Lane, The Raggy Dolls and Mooncat). Eesup's Foibles stories were written by Shirley Isherwood. Neil Innes provided the music and songs featured. Puppeteer for Middler and Mossop, Richard Robinson, created the puppets and provided illustrations for the Eesup's Foibles stories. David Baker was assistant puppeteer series 1 through 6 and Garry Rutter for the show's last three years.
Garry Rutter would later work on MacDonalds Farm puppeteering Baa Baa and The Fimbles Doing animatronic work.
 
Many of the programmes were recorded in Yorkshire Television's studios on Kirkstall Road, Leeds, although some later episodes were filmed on location. Five VHS releases were issued by Video Collection International, two DVDs were issued by Kids Club (VCI) and several tie-in books were published.

An episode from the fifth series was broadcast on the CITV channel on 6 January 2013, as part of a weekend of archive programmes to celebrate CITV's 30th anniversary.

Transmission guide

Series 1 (1989-1990)
Moving In – 2 November 1989
A Present for Marjorie – 9 November 1989
The Wedding Hat – 16 November 1989
The House Warming Party – 23 November 1989
The Riddling Tree – 30 November 1989
The Potted Plants – 7 December 1989
Sleepy Heads – 14 December 1989
Riddling Boots – 21 December 1989
Fishing – 11 January 1990
The Fairy – 18 January 1990
Decisions, Decision – 25 January 1990
Missing the Bus – 1 February 1990
Gone Camping – 8 February 1990
Mossop the Strongman – 15 February 1990
The Flittering – 22 February 1990
Bothersome Birds – 1 March 1990
Grimley's Tuba – 8 March 1990
In Search of the Lost Nuts – 15 March 1990
Tiddler's Beads – 22 March 1990
Postie the Prisoner – 29 March 1990
Robin's Nest – 5 April 1990
House Hunting – 12 April 1990
Mossop Shows the Way – 19 April 1990
Peace and Quiet – 26 April 1990
That's Torn It – 3 May 1990
Tiddler's Time Magic – 10 May 1990

Series 2 (1990-1991)
Mossop Needs A Haircut – 15 November 1990
Rat in the Garden – 22 November 1990
Middler – 29 November 1990
A Present from Middler – 6 December 1990
Tiddler at Bedtime – 13 December 1990
The Siege of Riddleton End – 20 December 1990
In the Soup – 10 January 1991
Tiddletricks Day – 17 January 1991
The Singing Tree – 24 January 1991
Grooming Grimley – 31 January 1991
Daft as Brushes – 7 February 1991
Mossop Builds a Car – 14 February 1991
Cat on the Run – 21 February 1991
Wet Paint – 28 February 1991
Spring Time for Middler – 7 March 1991
A Question of Balance – 14 March 1991
Mossop the Artist – 21 March 1991
Middler the Invisible – 28 March 1991
The Mystery of the Shrinking Tiddler – 4 April 1991
Mossop Loses His Voice – 11 April 1991
The Flood – 18 April 1991
Red Herring – 25 April 1991
Stop, Look and Listen – 2 May 1991
The Lightning Machines – 9 May 1991
Holiday Plans – 16 May 1991
Tiddler's Test – 23 May 1991

Series 3 (1991-1992)
Stones from the Sky – 12 December 1991
Lights Out – 19 December 1991
Treasure of Riddleton End – 9 January 1992
Mossop the Hero – 16 January 1992
Mossop and Grimley – Builders – 23 January 1992
Middler's Invisible Horse – 30 January 1992
A Brush With Mossop – 6 February 1992
The Riddlestone Necklace – 13 February 1992
The Search for a Riddling Tree – 20 February 1992
Top Hat and Tails – 27 February 1992
The Honorary Riddler – 5 March 1992
A Riddler at Last – 12 March 1992
Mossop's Magic Cleaner – 19 March 1992
Tiddlup Doesn't Live Here Anymore – 26 March 1992
Mossop the Thinker – 2 April 1992
Learning to Teach – 9 April 1992
Counting on Mossop – 16 April 1992
Skate Expectations – 23 April 1992
The Speeding Detective – 30 April 1992
The Magnificent Handcart – 7 May 1992
Spider, Spider – 14 May 1992
Heavy Reading – 21 May 1992
Cold Comfort Cottage – 28 May 1992
That's Hen-Tertainment – 4 June 1992

Series 4 (1992-1993)
Water Music - 26 November 1992
Belt and Races – 3 December 1992
Worrying Developments – 10 December 1992
Edgar Saves the Day – 17 December 1992
Water Water Anywhere - 7 January 1993
Not Wanted on Voyage – 14 January 1993
Camp Sights – 21 January 1993
Beside the Seaside – 28 January 1993
Tickets to Ride – 4 February 1993
A Head for Heights – 11 February 1993
Fish And Ships – 18 February 1993
A Room for the Knight – 25 February 1993
Getting In Shape – 11 March 1993
Mossop on His Metal – 1 April 1993
Mossop The Genius – 8 April 1993
Too Big For His Boots – 15 April 1993
A Few Hiccups – 22 April 1993
The Nee Mossy Boots – 29 April 1993
The Riddlers on the Road – 6 May 1993
Doing Things Day – 13 May 1993

Series 5 (1993-1994)
Relatively Speaking – 7 September 1993
Squeamish - 9 September 1993
The Tooth Will Out - 14 September 1993
A Miner Problem – 16 September 1993
Back To School - 21 September 1993
Lucks And Ducks – 28 September 1993
A Whale of a Time – 30 September 1993
A Shady Character - 5 October 1993
A Complete Washout - 7 October 1993
The Wrong Lines - 12 October 1993
Not So Smart - 14 October 1993
A Hat For Middler - 19 October 1993
All the Fun of the Festival - 21 October 1993
Middler the Plotter - 26 October 1993
Daring in the Diary - 28 October 1993
Feeding Time - 2 November 1993
The Stowaway - 4 November 1993
The Isle Of Riddlers - 9 November 1983
The Rocket - 11 November 1993
The Missing Tickets - 16 November 1993
Vikings And Black Dogs - 18 November 1993
Three Legs, Four Horns, Seven Kingdoms - 23 November 1993
Fairies and Tales - 25 November 1993
Who’s Been Sleeping In My Cellar - 2 December 11993
Oh Brother - 7 December 1993 
A Job at the Circus - 9 December 1993
Roll Up, Fall Down - 14 December 1993
Glossop Moves In - 16 December 1993
The Unwelcome Guest - 4 January 1994

Series 6 (1994-1995)
Home And Wahey - 1 September 1994
All Fall Down - 8 September 1994
In Branches Everywhere - 22 September 1994
Trouble In Store - 29 September 1994
The Super Well - 6 October 1994
A Caravan For Middler - 13 October 1994
Flight To Holy Island - 20 October 1994
On Hadrian’s Wall - 27 October 1994
Dipping And Tripping - 3 November 1994
Tiddlup At The Wicket - 10 November 1994
A Face From The Past - 17 November 1994
Job Hunting - 24 November 1994
Last With The News - 1 December 1994
The Riddleton Circus - 8 December 1994
Punch And Judy - 15 December 1994
Trick Cycling - 5 January 1995
Oh Baby - 12 January 1995
Hush A Bye Mossop - 19 January 1995
Mossop Steps Out - 26 January 1995
A Tiddler At Play School - 2 February 1995
Mossop Returns - 9 February 1995
Loch Ness Mess - 16 February 1995
The Phantom Piper - 23 February 1995

Series 7 (1995-1996)
Hair Today Gone Tomorrow - 7 September 1995
Just For Kicks - 14 September 1995
A Test For Middler - 21 September 1995
Loch Ness Mess - 28 September 1995
Where On Earth - 5 October 1995
French Lessons - 12 October 1995
Bon Appetit - 19 October 1995
Listen To The Band - 26 October 1995
Eesup - 2 November 1995
Let Loose In The Library - 9 November 1995
A Tiddler’s Best Friend - 16 November 1995
It’s A Dog Life - 23 - November 1995
Dog Tired - 30 November 1995
Highland Fun And Games - 11 January 1996
A Little Bit Of Dirt - 18 January 1996
At The Hospital - 25 January 1996
Mossop The Invalid - 1 February 1996
Mossop The Conkeror - 22 February 1996
Mr Grimley The Golfer - 29 February 1996

Series 8 (1996-1997)
Vote For Mossop - 5 September 1996
Your Place Or Mine - 26 September 1996
Well Dressed Wells - 3 October 1996
Episode 006 - 10 October 1996
Middler’s Mansion - 17 October 1096
The Tiddler’s Holiday Camp - 24 October 1996
Statue There - 31 October 1996
Under The Greenwood Tree - 28 November 1996
A Hunting We Will Go - 5 December 1996
Eesup Junior - 12 December 1996
Not A Leg To Stand On - 19 December 1996
Chairs And Stairs - 9 January 1997
Mossop Calling - 16 January 1997
Middler’s Taxi Service - 23 January 1997
Lollipop Middler - 30 January 1997
Clothes For Your Nose - 6 February 1997
Playing Chopsticks - 13 March 1997

Series 9 (1997-1998)
Ideal Home 9 - September 1997
Dumb Waiters - 16 September 1997
The Sinking Feeling - 23 September 1997
All Stuck Up - 30 September 1997
Cataways - 7 October 1997
Episode 005 - 14 October 1997
Episodes 006 - 21 October 1997
Episode 007 - 28 October 1997
Middlers Cafe - 4 November 1997
The Metal Detector - 11 November 1997
The Time Machine - 18 November 1997
Mystery In History - 25 November 1997
Back To The Stone Age - 2 December 1997
Blow Up - 9 December 1997
Episode 015 - 16 December 1997
The Spooks Of Riddleton End - 18 June 1998
Mossop’s Art Gallery - 25 June 1998
Good Sports - 2 July 1998
Hoe Hoe Hoe - 9 July 1998
Riddler Scouts - 16 July 1998
Tall Small And Small And Basketball - 23 July 1998
Creepy Crawlies - 30 July 1998
Fashion Victims - 6 August 1998
Little Red Riding Hood 13 - August 1998
That’s Rich - 20 August 1998
Good Morning Mr Magpie - 27 August 1998

UK VHS releases

References

External links
The Riddlers at Little Gems

Rick Vanes official site – pre-school television

Television series by Yorkshire Television
ITV children's television shows
Television series by ITV Studios
Television shows set in Yorkshire
British television shows featuring puppetry
Fictional species and races
British children's fantasy television series
1980s British anthology television series
1990s British anthology television series
1989 British television series debuts
1998 British television series endings
1980s British children's television series
1990s British children's television series
English-language television shows
Fictional people from Yorkshire